John Davis (August 7, 1788 – April 1, 1878) was a member of the U.S. House of Representatives from Pennsylvania.

Early life
John Davis was born in Solebury Township, Pennsylvania. He moved to Maryland and settled on a farm at Rock Creek Meeting House in 1795. He returned to Pennsylvania in 1812 and settled in what is now Davisville, Pennsylvania to engage in agricultural and mercantile pursuits.

Career

Military
He served as a served as captain in the War of 1812. He rose to the rank of major general of militia.

Political
Davis was elected as a Democrat to the 26th Congress. He was an unsuccessful candidate for re-election in 1840 to the 27th Congress.

Davis was appointed surveyor of the port of Philadelphia by President James K. Polk and served from 1845 to 1849.

Later life and death
Davis resumed his former business activities and died in Davisville in 1878, interred in Davisville Baptist Church Cemetery in Bucks County, Pennsylvania.

References

External links

 See also "A Genealogical and Personal History of Bucks County, Pennsylvania, Volume I", pp. 46–48 by William W. H. Davis,   Preview available at google books

1788 births
1878 deaths
American militia generals
People from Pennsylvania in the War of 1812
Baptists from Pennsylvania
People from Bucks County, Pennsylvania
Democratic Party members of the United States House of Representatives from Pennsylvania
Burials in Pennsylvania
19th-century American politicians
19th-century Baptists
Military personnel from Pennsylvania